William Rees Thomas (20 August 1903 – 30 November 1991) was a Welsh footballer.

Thomas attained two caps for the Wales national football team in 1930 against England and Scotland. Thomas played club football for Newport County.

References

1903 births
1991 deaths
Welsh footballers
Wales international footballers
Newport County A.F.C. players
English Football League players
Association football forwards